The A10 (Circular Regional Exterior de Lisboa) is a short Portuguese motorway to the north and north-east of Lisbon.

It provides a relatively direct connection between the A9 (Lisbon Regional Outer Circular) at the Junction 7 (Benavente), the A1  at Carregado  and the A13 with which it links at  Benavente.

The newest portion of the road, incorporating the Lezíria Bridge (Ponte da Lezíria) was opened in July 2007.

Together with the A13, the eastern portion of the A10 permits traffic traveling between the north and the south of Portugal to avoid both Lisbon and its conurbation, passing through primarily rural land to the east of the capital, thereby shortening the journey for drivers and reducing congestion in the urban zones.

References

Motorways in Portugal